Inclined Temple is a remote 7,150-foot (2,180 meter) elevation summit located in Zion National Park, in Washington County of southwest Utah, United States.

Description

Its nearest neighbor is Ivins Mountain, one half mile to the north, and South Guardian Angel is set approximately three miles to the west-northwest. Its name was officially adopted in 1935 by the U.S. Board on Geographic Names. This geographical feature is so named because its broad top has a decided incline. Precipitation runoff from this mountain drains into North Creek, a tributary of the Virgin River.

Climate
Spring and fall are the most favorable seasons to visit Inclined Temple. According to the Köppen climate classification system, it is located in a Cold semi-arid climate zone, which is defined by the coldest month having an average mean temperature below 32 °F (0 °C), and at least 50% of the total annual precipitation being received during the spring and summer.

See also

 Geology of the Zion and Kolob canyons area
 Colorado Plateau

Gallery

References

External links
 Zion National Park National Park Service
 Inclined Temple: Weather forecast

Mountains of Utah
Zion National Park
Mountains of Washington County, Utah
Sandstone formations of the United States
Landforms of Washington County, Utah
Buttes of Utah
North American 2000 m summits